Princeton Tower Club is one of the eleven eating clubs at Princeton University in Princeton, New Jersey, United States, and one of seven clubs to choose its members through a selective process called bicker. Tower is located at 13 Prospect Avenue between the university-run Campus Club and the Cannon Club; it currently has a membership of approximately 215.

History
In the spring of 1902, based on the idea of four sophomores, John Lee '04, Henry Pogue '04, Otto Wolff '04, Conway Shearer '04, and Frank "Pop" Little '03 led the formation of a new upperclass eating club. In April, a stake of four hundred dollars was placed to ensure the secure formation of the club the following year.

In September of the same year, the Princeton Tower Club was formed in the old Monastery Club on University Place, across the university from its current location. It was composed of thirteen members of the senior class and thirteen juniors. During that year, the club hoped to move to a much coveted plot on Prospect Avenue, but settled for the Gulick House on Olden Street. Gulick was also known as the "Incubator" because it had served as a first home for a number of the infant eating clubs. After one term in the Incubator, Tower purchased a plot of land from the Cottage Club and, in September 1904, moved to a new home at 89 Prospect Avenue. Seven years later, Tower moved to its current location at 13 Prospect Avenue.

Under the leadership of Tower, an Inter-Club Council was formed to address issues involving all of the Princeton eating clubs. Tower also led the formation of the Princeton Prospect Foundation, which enables educational opportunities on "The Street." In 1971, Tower became one of the first clubs to accept women.

Tower Club has long been an incubator of student activism and intellectual exploration. Such activities include the formation of at least one long-standing secret society, known only for keeping the hearth aflame.

Membership
Only currently enrolled Princeton students can be members of Tower Club; the majority of the membership is composed of juniors and seniors, with new sophomore members admitted each spring during "bicker." Spring bicker is held during the first two to three days of the second semester. Students are informed of their membership status on the Friday of the first week of second semester classes, then initiated the same weekend.

There is also a smaller bicker process held each October and open exclusively to students in their junior and senior years. The details of bicker, discussions and initiations are kept secret to preserve club tradition. Traditionally known to attract both artistic and politically engaged students on campus, Tower was the most bickered eating club between 2007 and 2010 with an acceptance rate of under 50%.

References

 Club Life at Princeton, 1994. Princeton, NJ: Princeton Prospect Foundation. 
 http://etcweb.princeton.edu/Campus/text_Tower.html

External links
 Princeton Tower Club
 Daily Princetonian article

Eating clubs at Princeton University
Historic district contributing properties in Mercer County, New Jersey